Banque Populaire Maroco Centrafricaine (BPMC) is a major bank in the Central African Republic.  It is affiliated with La Banque Centrale Populaire in Morocco.

External links

Banque Centrale Populaire, the parent company, in Morocco 

Banks of the Central African Republic
Banks with year of establishment missing